Fez most often refers to:
 Fez (hat), a type of felt hat commonly worn in the Ottoman Empire
 Fez, Morocco (or Fes), the second largest city of Morocco

Fez or FEZ may also refer to:

Arts and media
 Fez (Frank Stella), a 1964 painting by the modern artist Frank Stella
 Fez (That '70s Show), a fictional character from the TV series That '70s Show
 Fez (video game), a 2012 puzzle/platform game

Music
 "The Fez", a song from Steely Dan's 1976 album The Royal Scam 
 "Fez – Being Born", a song from U2's 2009 album No Line on the Horizon
 Live at Fez, a 2004 album by Bree Sharp
 Live from Fez, a 2005 album by David Berkeley

Other
 Fès–Saïs Airport (IATA code: FEZ), an airport serving Fès in Morocco
 Fez (nightclub), a nightclub and restaurant in New York City's NoHo District
 Fez Whatley (born 1964), American talk radio host and comedian
 FEZ-like protein, a family of eukaryotic proteins
 Free economic zone, designated area in which companies are taxed very lightly or not at all

See also 
 FES (disambiguation)
 The Silver Fez, a 2009 South African documentary film